Love and Bruises is a 2011 French/Chinese drama film directed by Lou Ye. The film premiered at the 68th Venice International Film Festival.

Plot
Adrift in Paris, Hua meets Mathieu. An intense, violent love affair begins. Hua tries to leave, unaware of the strength of her addiction.

Cast
 Corinne Yam as Hua
 Tahar Rahim as Mathieu
 Jalil Lespert as Giovanni
 Vincent Rottiers as Eric
 Shao Sifan as Liang Bin
 Zhang Songwen as Ding Yi
 Patrick Mille as Thierry
 Adèle Ado as Nina, Mathieu's wife

References

External links
 

2011 films
2011 drama films
2010s Mandarin-language films
2010s French-language films
Films directed by Lou Ye
Chinese drama films
French drama films
2011 multilingual films
Chinese multilingual films
French multilingual films
2010s French films